The Sukkur rail disaster occurred on 4 January 1990 in the village of Sangi near Sukkur in the Sindh Province of Pakistan. 307 people were killed, making it Pakistan's worst rail disaster.

The train concerned (Bahauddin Zakaria Express) was on an  overnight run from Multan to Karachi and was carrying many more passengers in its 16 carriages than its 1408-seat capacity. It was supposed to pass straight through the village of Sangi but incorrectly set rail points sent it into a siding where it collided with an empty 67-car freight train at a speed of at least . The first three carriages were destroyed and the next two badly damaged; 307 people were killed and 700 injured.

The investigation found railway staff to be 'directly responsible' for the disaster. Three staff on duty at Sangi station were charged with manslaughter.

Sources
At Least 210 Die in Pakistan's Worst Rail Crash from The New York Times
An improperly set railroad switch is blamed for the early morning collision from the Los Angeles Times

References

Train collisions in Pakistan
Railway accidents in 1990
1990 disasters in Pakistan
Sukkur District
Transport in Sindh
History of Sindh (1947–present)
January 1990 events in Asia
Accidents and incidents involving Pakistan Railways